Ali Mohammad Dar is an Indian politician and a former Member of Legislative Council in the Union Territory of Jammu & Kashmir he belongs to the Jammu and Kashmir National Conference and serves as a senior leader there he contested elections from the Chadoora (Vidhan Sabha constituency) in 1996 and won, he again fought elections in 2002, 2008, 2014 but lost.

References 

Jammu and Kashmir politicians
Jammu and Kashmir MLAs 1996–2002
Kashmiri people
Members of the Jammu and Kashmir Legislative Council
Jammu & Kashmir National Conference politicians
Living people
Year of birth missing (living people)